Cape Flissingsky (Mys Flissingskiy) is a cape on Northern Island, Novaya Zemlya, Russia. It is considered the easternmost point of Europe,  including islands.

The cape was discovered by Willem Barents in 1596, during his pursuit of the northern sea route to Asia. It is named after the Dutch city of Vlissingen, the original name being 't Vlissinger Hooft.

The cape is a few km from the shelter that Barents and his crew built to overwinter from 1596–97, and he ultimately died the next year. A memorial cross in his honor is erected in the same area.

See also
Extreme points of Europe

Flissingsky
Extreme points of Earth
Novaya Zemlya